Danaë is a c. 1570 oil painting by the Italian artist Tintoretto which was acquired by the Museum of Fine Arts of Lyon in 1811 and still hangs there. 

The canvas depicts a scene from the legend of Zeus and Danaë. According to the legend King Acrisius of Argos was warned by an oracle that he would be killed by his own grandson. To frustrate the prediction he locked up his beautiful only daughter Danaë in a specially constructed bronze chamber. However,  Zeus, king of the gods, desired her so much that he managed to enter the chamber as a shower of golden rain and impregnated her. A child was born which she named Perseus, who would later, with the help of his father and other gods, kill the Gorgon Medusa. Later the oracle's phrophesy came true when Perseus accidentally killed his grandfather during a throwing event at the Larissa athletic games.

The scene portrays Danaë instructing her maidservant to collect golden leaves from her nether regions, whose very presence there suggested that Zeus' tactic had been successful.

References

 The article is partly based on the equivalent article in French Wikipedia

1570s paintings
Paintings by Tintoretto
Paintings in the collection of the Museum of Fine Arts of Lyon
Tintoretto
Nude art
Dogs in art